The Great Execution is the eighth studio album by Brazilian death metal band Krisiun. It was released on 31 October 2011 by Century Media Records and produced by Andy Classen. The album was made available as a digital download, CD and vinyl format, including a limited edition transparent red edition. A limited edition version of the album contains a re-recording of the track "Black Force Domain". A music video for "The Will To Potency" was released on 13 December 2012. A music video for "Blood of Lions" was released on 16 October 2014.

Track listing

Personnel
All information is derived from the enclosed booklet.

Krisiun
 Alex Camargo – bass, vocals
 Moyses Kolesne – guitar
 Max Kolesne – drums

Additional musicians
 Marcello Caminha – acoustic guitar on "The Will to Potency" (Intro) and "The Sword of Orion" (Outro)
 João Gordo – vocals on "Extincão em Massa"

Production and artwork
 Andy Classen – production, recording, mixing, and mastering
 Toshihiro Egawa – artwork
 Krisiun – production

References

External links
The Great Execution (+ Digital Booklet): Krisiun: Amazon.co.uk: MP3 Downloads
Century Media Records - Krisiun - The Great Execution
KRISIUN - The Will To Potency (OFFICIAL VIDEO) - YouTube

2013 albums
Krisiun albums
Century Media Records albums
Albums with cover art by Toshihiro Egawa